Sabhan Adam (born 19 January 1973) is a Syrian plastic artist.

References
Sabhan Adam, Barjeel Art Foundation.  Retrieved 27 Dec 2013.

Syrian sculptors
1973 births
Living people
Syrian contemporary artists
21st-century Syrian artists